The 19th Infantry Division was a formation of the Ottoman Army, during the Balkan Wars and the First World War. Two thirds of the division was made up of Syrian Arabs, who faced the first wave of the Allied invasion during the Gallipoli campaign, and one third were Turks.

Formation
Commander: Lieutenant Colonel Mustafa Kemal
57th Regiment: Major Hüseyin Avni
1st Battalion Captain Ahmet Zeki
2nd Battalion Captain Ata
3rd Battalion Captain Hayri
72nd Regiment: Major Mehmet Münir
77th Regiment: Major Saip
39th Artillery Regiment: Major Halil Galib (Tekaki)

The 18th and 27th Regiments were also assigned to the division later in the Gallipoli campaign.

References

Military units and formations of the Ottoman Empire in the Balkan Wars
Military units and formations of the Ottoman Empire in World War I
Infantry divisions of the Ottoman Empire